Victor Hernández Cruz (born February 6, 1949) is a Puerto Rican poet. In 1981, Life magazine named him one of America's greatest poets.

Biography

Early years
Hernández Cruz was born in Aguas Buenas, Puerto Rico. In 1954, his family moved to New York City and lived in Spanish Harlem. There he received his primary and secondary education. He began to write poetry while attending Benjamin Franklin High School.

Poetry career
During his high school years he wrote various poems, including "Snaps". In 1969, Random House published his collection Snaps and the following year his poetry began to appear in various publications including Evergreen Review and the New York Review of Books.

In 1970, Hernández Cruz worked with New York's "Poetry-in-the-school" program. He moved to San Francisco in 1973 and served as a visiting poet in various colleges. From 1973 to 1975, he read and performed his works as a traveling troubadour, covering much of the United States.

Hernández Cruz received fellowships from the National Endowment for the Arts and the John Simon Guggenheim Memorial Foundation.

In 1981, the April issue of Life magazine proclaimed Hernández Cruz a National Treasure when they included his name among the greatest American poets. He is the first Hispanic in the US to have this honor bestowed on him.

Memberships
Hernández Cruz is a distinguished member of the famed Nuyorican school of poets (also referred to as the Nuyorican Movement). He tweaks syntactic conventions of English and Spanish to communicate his own voice.

He was Chancellor of the Academy of American Poets.

Awards
 International Griffin Poetry Prize
 Guggenheim Foundation
 National Endowment for the Arts fellowships

Works
 Papo Got His Gun, 1966 (chapbook).
 Snaps, Random House, 1969. 135 pp.
 
 
 
  (shortlisted for the 2002 International Griffin Poetry Prize)

Reviews
Allen Ginsberg wrote about Snaps:
Poesy news from space anxiety police age inner city, spontaneous urban American language as Williams wished, high school street consciousness transparent, original soul looking out intelligent Bronx windows.

See also

 Before Columbus Foundation
 List of Puerto Rican writers
 List of Puerto Ricans
 Puerto Rican literature
 Puerto Rican poetry
 Latino literature

Notes

References

External links
Griffin Poetry Prize biography
Griffin Poetry Prize reading, including video clip
Online interview with author on Letras Latinas Oral History Project.

1949 births
American male poets
Living people
People from Aguas Buenas, Puerto Rico
Puerto Rican poets
Puerto Rican male writers
20th-century Puerto Rican poets
21st-century Puerto Rican poets
People from East Harlem